Tsedendorjiin Bazarsüren (born 19 January 1957) is a Mongolian archer.

Career 

She finished 29th in the women's individual event at the 1980 Summer Olympic Games with 2112 points scored.

References

External links
 

1957 births
Living people
Mongolian female archers
Olympic archers of Mongolia
Archers at the 1980 Summer Olympics
Place of birth missing (living people)
20th-century Mongolian women